The 2018 Mackay Cutters season was the 11th in the club's history. Coached by Steve Sheppard and captained by Tom Murphy, they competed in the QRL's Intrust Super Cup. The club missed the finals for the fifth consecutive season, finishing last and winning their third wooden spoon.

Season summary
The Cutters entered 2018 with a younger and less experienced side following the departures of co-captains Andrew Davey and Setaimata Sa. New recruits included Wests Tigers NSW Cup duo Jordan Grant and Darcy Cox, Northern Pride forward Jack Brock and former Canberra Raiders U20 back Jack Hickson.

Another poor start to the season followed for the club, as they won just three of their first nine games. Things went from bad to worse after their bye week, as they went on a club record 10-game losing streak. Halfback Cooper Bambling rejoined the club mid-season after joining the Canberra Raiders in the off-season but his return would not help the club's fortunes. The streak ended in Round 21 with a 16-all draw against the Redcliffe Dolphins. The club won just one more game and finished the season in last place.

Jordan Grant won the club's Player of the Year and Players' Player awards in his first season with the Cutters.

Squad List

2018 squad

Squad movement

Gains

Losses

Fixtures

Regular season

Statistics

Honours

Club
Player of the Year: Jordan Grant
Players' Player: Jordan Grant
Rookie of the Year: Jye Andersen
Club Person of the Year: Danell Curtis

References

2018 in Australian rugby league
2018 in rugby league by club
Mackay Cutters